The Test is the 43rd book in the Animorphs series, written by K.A. Applegate.  It was ghostwritten by Ellen Geroux.  It is narrated by Tobias.

Plot summary
As the book opens, Tobias discovers Bobby McIntire, a missing child who was hiking through the woods. He leads the boy's father and a search party to his son.

Throughout the book Tobias deals with the psychological after-effects of the torture he endured at the hands of the sadistic sub-visser Taylor. He continues to question his own strength and resolve.

Taylor, claiming she is now part of the Yeerk Peace Movement, enlists Tobias to try and sabotage the Yeerk Pool.  All of the other Animorphs, except for Cassie, who declines on moral grounds, accompany him and Ax as they dig a tunnel to the pool. In order to dig a tunnel to the Yeerk Pool, Tobias and Ax alternate turns in Taxxon morph, which has a nearly uncontrollable constant hunger. However, it is revealed that Taylor has been working for Visser Three, and sets off a gas explosion. Cassie is able to turn off the gas from its control station, injuring several humans in the process. She is once again distraught by the violence she has had to use to save her friends. Taylor is presumably killed in the gas explosion.

The book ends with Rachel and Tobias on the beach. She holds his hand and reassures him that he is not weak, encouraging him to let go of the past.

Morphs

Tobias also morphs an unspecified animal in order to heal his injuries prior to morphing the flea.

Animorphs books
2000 American novels
2000 science fiction novels
Books about birds